Monster Allergy is an Italian comic book series created by Alessandro Barbucci, Katja Centomo, Francesco Artibani and Barbara Canepa of Sky Doll. Barbucci and Canepa had previously co-created the W.I.T.C.H. comic series. Monster Allergy lasted 29 issues; however, it is still in the course of reprints, in newspaper stands on the 13th of every month. In 2008, Barbara Canepa stated that she and her co-creators gained back the copyright to Monster Allergy after its first publishing run.

On 24 May 2015, Tunué announced the new edition of the complete comic book, in two volumes of over 700 pages each, including a final unpublished episode.

A sequel series titled Monster Allergy Evolution began in 2016.

Plot 
Monster Allergy details the adventures of Elena Potato, who moves with her family to Old Mill Village, and Ezekiel Zick, whose father is missing and is affected by all sorts of allergies including one that allows him to see monsters. Together, they uncover the secrets of the world of monsters. Zick and Elena face terrible danger and enemies, which they are usually able to overcome. They are aided by Timothy-Moth, Zick's "cat", who is actually a kind of monster called a Tutor. Timothy oversees the monsters who live in Zick's house which is an oasis for criminal monsters.

Monster Allergy Evolution follows the adventures of Zick and Elena in college, where they eventually enter into a romantic relationship.

Characters

Tamers 
Monster Tamers pass the natural power of the Tone from parent to child, thus creating long dynasties of heroes. Tamers are able to spot monsters and tame them. If the monster refuse to be subdued, they are captured and imprisoned in special containers, a Taming Box (Dombox). This containers has been specially treated in order to preserve the prisoner while preventing its escape. Every type of monster needs its own special Taming Box (Dombox) and canning method. The Tamer's special skill lies in mastering these methods and in knowing all the many types of monster races. Most importantly, a Tamer must master the Tone, which is extremely powerful but is strictly connected and dependent on the skills of the Tamers who wields it. Tamers have a particularly sensitive sense of smell, which helps them perceive the presence of monsters or danger in general.

Monster Tamer's Handbook
 The Tone - A natural energy that can subjugate Monsters and Phantoms. This talent is not just limited to taming. If it is developed correctly, it can unleash unexpected powers in its bearer. The hand gesture strengthens the Tamer's orders and allows him/her to move through walls, breath under water, or tame telepathically. The Tone is weakened by the scent of lavender, and if a Tamer's voice cannot be heard, his/her powers will not work.
 The Taming Move - it is of utmost important to the Monster Tamer. The hand movement strengthens the orders of the voice and helps direct the flow of power. But it can work both ways: an incorrect gesture can ruin even the most persuasive orders of the voice.
 The Canning Process - In order to imprison Monster-Skas in Taming Boxes (Domboxes), all Tamers have to follow the same procedure. First of all, the monster must be subdued using the power of the voice. Only when this has been done can the Move be used. The Tamer, with their right hand, makes a special canning move that sucks the monster safety into the Taming Box (Dombox). The final closing of the jar is of vital importance, because if it is not carried out quickly and firmly, the entire operation can be undone.
 Developing the Tone - In order to do this, they use the Tone, an internal power that, though careful study and diligent practice, can be developed for uses far beyond their wildest imagination. A Tamer learns to use the Tone in many different ways in the course of their training. You can tell how experienced an aspiring Tamers is from the way they use the tone and from the number of ways he can apply it.
 Tamers' Clans - The Tone is a hereditary power, passed on parent to child through the lineage of the Great Tamers' Clans. Every Family has a special way of Taming, which remains unchanged through the centuries. It is a quality, such as courage, strength or cunning, that helps the Tamer do their job. These characteristics will define the nature of the entire clan.
 Tamers' History - Historically, Tamers were an essential part of monster society and enjoyed great respect, because they defended Bibbur-Si from the Monster-Skas and Dark Phantoms. But then some of the Tamers abused their powers, canning and taming even good monsters. The Council of Tutors was forced to send the entire every Tamer Clan into exile and their dynasties were scattered and sent to Detention Oases in the cities below. Nowadays, Monster Tamers are visible and a normal part of human society.

The Universal Signs
In the monster world, the Astronomer Monsters create this Universal Sign to know the characteristic of a person or a monster to predict their future and knowing their personalities.<ref name="issue14">See Comic Issue 14: "Together Again"</ref>

How to know your sign: Add up the numbers of your birthday (for example if you've born on 26 November, you have to add 2+6+1+1=10 and then 1+0=1), Find the number of the respective signs. But if you got a 9, then you can choose between the first and last sign.

 1. Pum-Palom - The Carefree Sign. Kind-hearted and distracted they never know what they're doing. They're very friendly, but they've always got their head in the clouds.
 2. Dum-Papum - The Blundering Sign. They are characterized by their cleverness and creativity. Unfortunately, they are total bunglers and often muddle up their brilliant ideas.
 3. Dum-Tatyn - The Sensible Sign. They are responsible, proud and very brave. They are so polite that sometimes they'll even take the blame for things they didn't do.
 4. Pum-Terton - The High-spirited Sign. They love playing and they're always enthusiastic and cheerful. If it were up to them, they'd only ever have a good time.
 5. Dum-Gerpen - The Fine Dining Sign. They love rich and tasty food. They really enjoy having company and would happily spend all day munching chips with their friends.
 6. Pum-Tertyn - The Explosive Sign. They are quick and speedy; sometimes they're so hasty that they end up crashing into precious family heirloom vases or closed doors.
 7. Dum-Zazap - The Sensitive Sign. They are curious and in touch with their feelings. They are interested in everything, they read a lot and they'll open every drawer they see - to such an extent that they're sometimes considered nosy.
 8. Pum-Zap - The Extreme Sign. They see everything either bright red or dark green. When they are sure about something it's almost impossible to get them to change their mind.

KeepersMonster Keepers are humans who can "see" monsters, and allow them to live in their homes, in Detention Oases. They help the Tutors defend the monsters from the dangers of the human world as well as the monster world. The gift of Sight is passed from parent to child, and few special people, so that entire generations of Keepers can look after the Oasis in total secret.

Gift of Sight
A Keeper can give the "Gift of Sight" to the successor by putting their hands over their eyes. Mrs. Barrymore did this to Elena so she could be a better keeper. The donor does not lose their vision because they're only passing a tiny part of their powers. It's then up to the young Keepers to strengthen their vision through time.

Monster Keeper's Handbook

Lesson in Keeper Studies
The Keeper and the Monsters - While the Tutor of an Oasis watches over the detainees and tries to reform them, the Keeper brings them warmth and support. Therefore, they have to know the monsters' personalities and their background, where they're from and the reason for their tutelage. Every monster has its own needs, which the Keeper must know how to meet. As we know role of the Keeper is passed from parent to child, but they can be started fresh at any time.
A New World - When a young Keeper receives the "Gift of Sight", he/she experiences a moment of amazement and fright at the same time. Monsters, which he/she could only imagine in his/her mind until now, are certainly not what is expected. The new world that opens up before him/her can seem amazing and exciting, or frightening and bewildering.
Hello, meet your Keeper - Keepers mustn't be shy with their monsters. They must be kind, but they must let them see that they are confident right from the start, or else they'll take control of the house.
A Monstrous Test - When they first open an Oasis, they have to go through a trial period. The Keeper is given a few low-maintenance monsters that have committed minor offenses. If the Keeper shows to that he/she can perform the job, then a Tutor will come to the Oasis. He will be a strict Tutor for the other monsters that will arrive depending on the Oasis.
Theory and Practice - They need to complement the teachings of the Manual with practical experience. It's important to study the rules and regulations, but they mustn't forget that every monster is unique.

Build your own Oasis
The Detention Oasis - An Oasis worthy of its name should make all the guests feel comfortable, even though they each have different needs depending on which species they belong to. Therefore, a Keeper must know all the types of Monster-Si that may need accommodating in their colony.
Unexpected Surprises - Managing a group of monsters is a rather exhausting task, because it means having a house full of awkward guests who don't always follow the human rules of good manners.
Quirks of an Oasis - There will be many changes in the Keeper's house because of the monsters will try to recreate their own habitat within the Oasis.
Help is at Hand - Once a Tutor arrives, he or she will be able to help the Keeper maintain the Oasis to avoid chaos.

 Monsters 

 Chapters 
In the Philippines, Singapore, Malaysia, and other countries, Monster Allergy was published as a comic magazine last September 2004. However, Summit Media (the publisher of Monster Allergy in the Philippines) stopped publishing Monster Allergy at the 14th issue. In Malaysia, it stopped publishing it at the 27th issue. Chuang Yi Singapore finished publishing it until the 29th issue, the last of the comic book series. The comic book titles are quite different from the television series titles. Every issue contains a 44-page Monster Allergy story except the 30th issue that has 30 pages.

The Beginning

1. The House of MonstersMagnacat

2. The Pyramid of the Invulnerable / The Pyramid of Invulnerability3. The Mystery of Mister Magnacat4. The Suspended CityThe Monster Thrills

5. The Stellar Tutor6. Here Comes Charlie Schuster7. Pickled Monsters8. The Keeper of the Lighthouse9. The Return of Zob10. Inside the Hollow Tree11. The Anguanas of ErMeet the Thaurs

12. The Other Tamer13. The Mask of Fire14. Together AgainDeep in the Monster World

15. The Ancient Armoury 
16. Stormy Weather17. The Last Anchor18. The Lost Monsters19. The Great Escape20. Mushrooms and ChestnutsNew Adventures

21. A Trip to Kalamaludu-Si22. The Two Sisters23. The Form of the Shadow24. Sinistro's Circus25. The Invaders26. The Fall of the Barrymore House27. The Eye of Maggoth28. The 101st Door / The Hundredth and First Door29. Only for ElenaThe Ending

30. The Tamer CemeteryMonster Allergy Evolution

31. Domolacrum32. The Valley of the Bombos33. Do Not Kill34. Ariadne's Thread35. The Voice of the Shadow''

Merchandises and other media

Trading card game
A trading card game based on the same name was created by Upper Deck Company. It contains 110 collectible cards to play. Art was done by Blason Studio.

Video game
A 3D action adventure PC game was developed Artematica Entertainment in 2006. Copies of the game were given away in cereal boxes in Italy

Television series

An animated series based on the comics was jointly produced by Futurikon, Rainbow, M6, Rai Fiction and ZDF.  It was broadcast on Rai 2 in Italy, on Nickelodeon in The Netherlands and Belgium, on KiKa in Germany, on M6 in France, on YTV in Canada, and on Kids' WB in the United States.

References

External links 
 Monster Allergy at Disney Comic Worldwide
  Monster Allergy in SOLEILPROD 
  Monster Allergy at komix.it

Monster Allergy
Italian comics titles
Comics adapted into animated series
Comics adapted into television series
Comics adapted into video games
Disney comics titles